The 2007 Women's Premier Soccer League season was the 11th season of the WPSL.

FC Indiana finished the season as national champions, beating New England Mutiny in the WPSL Championship game in Tampa, Florida on 27 July 2007.

Changes From 2006

Name Changes
Fort Lauderdale Fusion changed their name to Miami Kickers
Philadelphia Pirates changed their name to Philadelphia Liberty

New Franchises
Seven franchises joined the league this year:

Folding
Seven teams left the league prior to the beginning of the season:
FC Virginia
Las Vegas Tabagators
Memphis Mercury
Miami Revolution
Michigan Phoenix
Rhode Island Rays
Tennessee Lady Blues

Final standings
Purple indicates division title clinched
Green indicates playoff berth clinched

West Conference

Midwest Conference

Southern Conference

South Division

Southwest Division

East Conference

North Division

Mid-Atlantic Division

Playoffs

Conference Divisional Round
Long Island Fury 3-2 SoccerPlus Connecticut

Conference Semi-finals
New England Mutiny 6-0 Northampton Laurels
Atlantic City Diablos 3-1 Long Island Fury

Conference Finals
New England Mutiny 2-1 Atlantic City Diablos
Tampa Bay Elite 2-1 Denver Diamonds
FC Indiana and Ajax America Women received byes to the national final four as the winners of their respective conferences

National Semi-finals
FC Indiana 1-1 Ajax America Women (Indiana wins 4-3 on penalties)
New England Mutiny 1-1 Tampa Bay Elite 1-1 (New England wins 5-4 on penalties)

WPSL Championship Game
FC Indiana 3-0 New England Mutiny

References

2007
Wom
1